The Chihsing Tan Katsuo Museum is a museum in Dahan Village, Xincheng Township, Hualien County, Taiwan. The museum is close to Qixingtan Beach and is dedicated to dried bonito fish (katsuobushi).

History
The museum was once a Japanese Katsuobushi factory which produced small dried fish flakes that would then be used in many Japanese dishes. It was then reopened as a museum in 2003.

Architecture
The museum is housed in a 3-story building.

Exhibitions
The museum exhibits the history of the bonito fish in Taiwan since the Japanese era.

Transportation
The museum is accessible east from Beipu Station of the Taiwan Railways.

See also
 List of museums in Taiwan

References

External links

  

2003 establishments in Taiwan
Food museums in Taiwan
Museums established in 2003
Museums in Hualien County